Mount Mawson  is a mountain and club skifield situated within the Mount Field National Park in southern Tasmania, Australia.

Skiing
Much of Tasmania is subject to at least occasional winter snows.

The Mount Mawson ski area was established as a club skifield in 1958 and is run by the Southern Tasmanian Ski Association. Mawson has three lifts: two intermediate rope tows and a third steep incline rope tow accessing steep terrain. A small amount of club accommodation is available and there are some self-catering huts in the national park.

See also

List of highest mountains of Tasmania
Skiing in Tasmania

References

External links
 Wikiski entry Mount Mawson on WIkiski
 Mount Mawson website
 * Information on all ski lifts to have operated at Mt Mawsonin the Australian Ski Lift Directory

Mawson
Tourist attractions in Tasmania
Ski areas and resorts in Tasmania